Wildflower  is the twelfth studio album by Hong Kong singer Sandy Lam, released by Stardust Records in December 1991. As part of the "unplugged" craze in the Cantopop scene, it is widely considered her signature album.

Track listing
All tracks produced by Clarence Hui and Sandy Lam, except "Let Me Live and Cry (reprise)" produced by Yang Zhen Long, and "Predestiny (multi-dimensional mix)" contains additional production by Patrick Delay.

Notes:
 signifies additional lyrics by
 signifies additional music by
"Wildflower Overture" is performed by Dick Lee.
"Moonflower" is a cover of Yoshiko Yamaguchi's song Yè lái xiāng (夜來香).
"Temptation of the Rose" is a cover of Yǐn Fang Ling's (尹芳玲) song Qiáng wēi zhī liàn (薔薇之戀).
"Predestiny" contains an uncredited excerpt from the poem Zàng huā cí (葬花詞) in the novel Dream of the Red Chamber.
"Promise Me" is the Cantonese version of the song of the same name, written and performed by Beverley Craven.
"Wildflower" is a cover of Skylark's 1972 song of the same.

References 

1991 albums
Sandy Lam albums